Emptinne is a village and a district in the municipality of Hamois, located in the province of Namur, Belgium. 

The area has been populated at least since Gallo-Roman times, as evidenced by archaeological discoveries. At the location of the hamlet Champion, a large Roman villa once stood. The two settlements also contain several large farm buildings from the 18th and 19th centuries.

References

External links

Former municipalities of Namur (province)